Ad. Liquica or Associação Desportiva Liquica is a football club of East Timor from Liquiçá. The team plays in the Taça Digicel.

References

Football clubs in East Timor
Football
Liquiçá Municipality
Association football clubs established in 2010
2010 establishments in East Timor